The 23rd Serbia Division (Serbo-Croatian Latin: Dvadesettreća srpska divizija) was a Yugoslav Partisan division formed on 6 June 1944 as the 3rd Serbia Division in Toplica. It was formed from the 7th and 9th Serbia Brigades. On 17 June 1944, the 14th Serbia Brigade was added to the division which at the time numbered around 2,000 soldiers. The division was under the direct command of the Supreme Headquarters until 6 September 1944 when it became part of the 14th Corps. On 9 December 1944, it came under the command of the Southern Operational Group and in January 1945 it became part of the 2nd Army.

References 

Divisions of the Yugoslav Partisans
Military units and formations established in 1944